In number theory, Rosser's theorem states that the nth prime number is greater than , where  is the natural logarithm function. It was published by J. Barkley Rosser in 1939.

Its full statement is:

Let pn be the nth  prime number.   Then for n ≥ 1

In 1999, Pierre Dusart proved a tighter lower bound:

See also
 Prime number theorem

References

External links
Rosser's theorem article on Wolfram Mathworld.

Theorems about prime numbers
de:John Barkley Rosser#Satz von Rosser